Atherinomorus aetholepis is a species of Old World silverside native to the western Pacific.

References 

Atheriniformes
Animals described in 2002